Bdellium  (also bdellion or false myrrh) is a semi-transparent oleo-gum resin extracted from Commiphora wightii plants of India, and from Commiphora africana trees growing in sub-saharan Africa. According to Pliny the best quality came from Bactria. Other named sources for the resin are India, Arabia, Media, and Babylon.

Composition 
Bdellium consists of a water-soluble gum, a resin, and an essential oil. The essential oil of Commiphora africana contains predominantly α-thujene, α- and β-pinene, and p-cymene.

Uses 
Bdellium is used in perfumery, as incense, and in traditional medicine. It is an adulterant of the more costly myrrh.

Name 
Middle English, from Latin, from Greek βδέλλιον.

Commiphora africana resin is also known as African bdellium.

History 

Theophrastus is perhaps the first classical author to mention bdellium, if the report that came back from his informant in Alexander's expedition refers to Commiphora wightii: "In the region called Aria there is a thorn tree which produces a tear of resin, resembling myrrh in appearance and odour. It liquefies when the sun shines upon it."

Plautus in his play Curculio refers to it. Pliny the Elder, in his Natural History (12:36), describes the best bdellium coming from Bactria (identified as Commiphora wightii) as a "tree black in colour, and the size of the olive tree; its leaf resembles that of the oak and its fruit the wild fig", as well as bdellium coming from Nubia (identified as Commiphora africana). However, his descriptions seem to cover a range of strongly perfumed resins. The Periplus of the Erythraean Sea, of the 2nd century CE, reports that bdella are exported from the port of Barbarice at the mouth of the Indus.

The bdellium referred to by Dioscorides as "the bdellium imported from Petra" (De Materia Medica, 1:80) is probably the resin of Hyphaene thebaica, a species of palm. The Arabs call it "Jewish bdellium."

In China, bdellium, known as ānxī xiāng (安息香) or "Parthian aromatic", was among the varieties of incense that reached China either along the Silk Route from Central Asia, or by sea. Later ānxī xiāng was applied to an East Indian substitute, gum benzoin from Sumatra.

Bdellium was an ingredient in the prescriptions of ancient physicians from Galen to Paul of Aegina, and in the Greater Kuphi.

Isidore of Seville reports in his Etymologiae (XVII.viii.6) that bdellium comes from trees in India and Arabia, the Arabian variety being better as it is smooth, whitish and smells good; the Indian variety is a dirty black and very delicious.

In the Bible
"Bdellium" is the common English translation in the Bible for the Hebrew bedolach, which appears in Genesis 2:12 and Numbers 11:7. In Genesis, it is given as a product of Havilah, where it is listed along with other precious items gold and onyx. In Numbers, the reference to bdellium is in the context of the manna eaten by the Israelites in the wilderness, which is said to have "the color of bdellium". These are the only two uses in the Hebrew scripture, and there is no agreement about whether the term bedolach actually referred to the resin. The Septuagint interprets it as the name of a precious stone, and Rashi describes it as "a precious stone, crystal".

Footnotes

References 

Incense material
Perfume ingredients
Resins